Cevat Yurdakul (1 January 1942 – 28 September 1979) was a prosecutor and the chief of police of Adana Province, Turkey, when he was assassinated in 1979. Adana Provincial Police Chief of the period was killed as a result of an armed attack prior to the 12 September coup.

Background
Yurdakul was a member of the Pol-Der who called them 'People's Policemen', and as soon as he started his work, murders went out targeting certain people. Yurdakul was appointed as Adana Provincial Police Director by the Ecevit government.

Death and aftermath
On the morning of September 28, 1979, Yurdakul was shot and killed by a bullet in the city of Adana by Abdurrahman Kıpçak and Muhsin Kehya. Halil Güllüoğlu, the lawyer of the Yurdakul family, was also killed on 6 February 1980. Muhsin Kehya broke out of prison a couple times, then fled to Germany. In 1997, Kehya returned to Turkey by German government with the condition of no death penalty. Then he was sentenced with 36 years of jail time. Finally, he was released from prison in 2012 as a result of legal arrangements made by AKP Government.  Other culprit, Kıpçak also broke out of prison after the killing and fled abroad. In 1989, he was caught with 47 kilos of heroin in Istanbul, then again released from prison after some time. Finally, he got killed as a result of armed assault in Istanbul, 2006.  

Halil İbrahim Altınışık, Kadir Akgöllü, Mustafa Gülnar, and Yücel Yirik was also faced trials after the murder as suspects. Varying and conflicting sources are present about the murder and who were responsible for it; including the leader of MHP at the time, Alparslan Türkeş was the one who gave the order, thus it still is not fully solved.

See also
List of unsolved murders

References

1942 births
1979 deaths
1979 murders in Turkey
20th-century Turkish lawyers
Deaths by firearm in Turkey
Male murder victims
People murdered in Turkey
Turkish police chiefs
Turkish prosecutors
Unsolved murders in Turkey
Political violence in Turkey